Golden Stairs may refer to:

 The Golden Stairs, an 1870s painting by Edward Burne-Jones
 Golden Stairs (Helena Blavatsky), a set of guidelines to aspirants in the spiritual path laid down by Helena P. Blavatsky
 Cliff Wood – Golden Stairs, an SSSI in the Vale of Glamorgan, south Wales, UK
 Golden Stairway or Golden Stairs, the final climb of the Chilkoot Pass

See also
 Climbing the Golden Stairs, 1929 U.S. musical fantasy film
Golden Stair Mountain, Ohio, New York, United States
 "Gold Steps," a 2015 song by Neck Deep from the album Life's Not out to Get You
 Stair (disambiguation)
 Golden (disambiguation)